William Connell (September 10, 1827March 21, 1909) was a Republican member of the U.S. House of Representatives from Pennsylvania.

Early life

Connell was born in Sydney in the Nova Scotia colony of British Canada, and moved with his parents to Hazleton, Pennsylvania, in 1844. He worked in the coal mines, and in 1856 he was appointed superintendent of the mines of the Susquehanna & Wyoming Valley Railroad & Coal Company, with offices in Scranton, Pennsylvania.

Career
Upon the expiration of that company's charter in 1870 he purchased its property and became one of the largest independent coal operators in the Wyoming Valley region. He was one of the founders of the Third National Bank of Scranton in 1872, and in 1879 he was chosen its president. He was also identified with many other industries and commercial enterprises of Scranton, including the Scranton Button Company, one of the largest manufacturers of buttons in the United States, which branched out into the manufacture of telephone parts and phonograph records. He was a delegate to the 1896 Republican National Convention, and a member of the Pennsylvania Republican committee.

Connell was elected as a Republican to the Fifty-fifth, Fifty-sixth, and Fifty-seventh Congresses.  He successfully contested the election of George Howell to the Fifty-eighth Congress.  The father of Charles Robert Connell, Connell died in Scranton in 1909.

Legacy
His summer estate, Lacawac, was listed on the National Register of Historic Places in 1979.

Sources

The Political Graveyard

1827 births
1909 deaths
Pre-Confederation Canadian emigrants to the United States
Politicians from Scranton, Pennsylvania
Politicians from Hazleton, Pennsylvania
Republican Party members of the United States House of Representatives from Pennsylvania
19th-century American politicians